Aster Glacier is an Antarctic glacier descending the east slope of Craddock Massif and flowing between Elfring Peak and Willis Ridge to Thomas Glacier in the Sentinel Range, Ellsworth Mountains in Antarctica. It was named by the Advisory Committee on Antarctic Names in 2006, after Richard Aster, Professor of Geophysics and Department Head of Geosciences at Colorado State University, whose research in Antarctica includes volcanological studies at the Mount Erebus volcano observatory on Ross Island,  glaciological, oceanic, and tectonic seismic source studies, seismic tomography, ice shelf studies, and the coupling of solid Earth geophysics and Antarctic ice sheet evolution.

See also
 List of glaciers in the Antarctic
 Glaciology

Maps
 Vinson Massif.  Scale 1:250 000 topographic map.  Reston, Virginia: US Geological Survey, 1988.
 Antarctic Digital Database (ADD). Scale 1:250000 topographic map of Antarctica. Scientific Committee on Antarctic Research (SCAR). Since 1993, regularly updated.

References
 

Glaciers of Ellsworth Land